Abhishek Pictures is a Film distribution and Production company that came into being in the early 70s. Its Founder, Nama Madhusudhan Rao’s prime focus during inception was distribution. The Company distributed close to 100 films across India. Mostly Hindi cinema at the time. The Business was later taken over by his son Abhishek Nama and has emerged as one of the leading film distribution companies in India. He aggressively worked on Hollywood and Bollywood films distribution initially and that put him on the map. There are many super hit films to his name including ‘Harry Potter and the Order of the Phoenix (film), ‘10,000 BC (film)’, ‘Pyaar Ke Side Effects’, 'Men in Black 3', '2012 (film)', 'My Name Is Khan', 'Dum Maaro Dum (film)'Kabali', 'Srimanthudu' He has distributed more than 100 films in a span of 15 years. In the year 2017, he decided to venture into Film Production. Abhishek Pictures in collaboration with People Media Factory produced ‘Goodachari’ starring Adivi Sesh earned him prominence in production. The film fared very well in the global market. Currently he is producing two high budget feature films, one of them being ‘Ravanasura’ starring Mass Maharaja Ravi Teja and ‘Devil’ starring Nandamuri Kalyan Ram. Abhishek started an OTT wing that will focus majorly on digital film/series production.

Early life, Distribution and Success 
Abhishek Nama was born on April 19, in the early 80s in Hyderabad. His father, Nama Madhusudhan Rao was a popular Film Distributor in the 70s and 80s. Abhishek studied BFA (Bachelor of Fine Arts) and was always inclined towards everything creative. He initially started off on his own with a marketing/publicity agency. With little to no help taken from anyone, he brought up the company to a respectable status. He realised, though happy with his success, needed to do something more. He convinced his father and took over Abhishek Pictures at a very young age. He built an empire with sheer sincerity and the choices he made in distribution. He picked up his first film in 2006, Pyaar Ke Side Effects', He then went on to buy Hollywood films for distribution, famous ones like '10,000 BC (film)', 'Harry Potter and the Order of the Phoenix (film)', 'Knight and Day', 'X-Men: First Class', 'Life of Pi (film)'. He didn't spare Bollywood either, he had his hands in everything that meant success, consistently for a while. He joined hands with prominent figures like D. Suresh Babu, Sunil Narang and co, in association with Global Cinemas, distributed Super hits like  'Gunde Jaari Gallanthayyinde, 'Manam (film)', 'Attarintiki Daredi'. In the Year 2015, After a slight set back, he decided to venture out on his own and started buying films. He got immense success with 'Srimanthudu'. Soon, before he even realised, Abhishek Pictures distributed more than 100 films.

Production company

Being a successful distribution company, In the year 2017, He had his calling. He decided to up the ante by producing Feature films. 'Babu Baga Busy' was his first film as a Producer. He went on to produce, ‘Saakshyam’, ‘Goodachari’, ‘Keshava (film)’. Goodachari brought him a good name as a producer and put him on the map. In 2022, Abhishek Pictures ventured into producing content for Over-the-top, be it in the form of web-films or web-series or reality shows, he plans to make his mark in this space as well.

Upcoming projects and plans

Currently, ‘Ravanasura’ starring Mass Maharaja Ravi Teja is on schedule with its Principal photography and is set to release at the end of 2022. This film is in collaboration with RT Team Works, has garnered a lot of attention and is sure to become a box-office hit under the Direction of Sudheer Varma. ‘Devil – The British Secret Agent’ starring Nandamuri Kalyan Ram will be going on floors very soon. This film is set in 1945 and is sure to enthral the audience. The speciality of Abhishek is the stories he chooses to produce, his versatility in choices makes him a class apart. In 2022, Abhishek Pictures ventured into producing content for Over-the-top, be it in the form of web-films or web-series or reality shows, he plans to make his mark in this space as well. Currently in production is Prema Vimanam.

Filmography

Film distribution

Telugu

Hollywood

Other languages

References

External links
 

Film production companies based in Hyderabad, India
Indian companies established in 1976
1976 establishments in Andhra Pradesh